Guido Cominotto (Mestre, 4 October 1901 - 9 March 1967) was an Italian sprinter (400 m) and middle distance runner (800 m).

Biography
Guido Cominotto participated at two editions of the Summer Olympics (1924, 1928), he had 7 caps in national team from 1924 to 1928.

Achievements

National titles
Guido Cominotto has won 6 times the individual national championship.
2 wins on 400 metres (1922, 1923)
4 wins on 800 metres (1922, 1923, 1924, 1926)

See also
 Italy national relay team

References

External links
 

1901 births
1967 deaths
Sportspeople from Venice
Italian male sprinters
Athletes (track and field) at the 1924 Summer Olympics
Athletes (track and field) at the 1928 Summer Olympics
Olympic athletes of Italy
Italian Athletics Championships winners
People from Mestre-Carpenedo